Metachanda autocentra is a moth species in the oecophorine tribe Metachandini. It was described by Edward Meyrick in 1911.

Its type locality is Silhouette Island, Seychelles. It is also known from Félicité, another island of Seychelles.

References

Oecophorinae
Moths described in 1911
Taxa named by Edward Meyrick
Moths of Seychelles